Hovden is used for many place names and surnames in Norway. One meaning of the name comes from the Old Norse word for head (hovud), which refers to a steep, overhanging mountain or cliff in the vicinity (when used as a place name). The second meaning is derived from the Norse word for sacrificial site (hov).

Hovden may refer to:

Places

Norway
Hovden, Agder, a village in the municipality of Bykle in Agder county
Hovden, Kinn, an island in the municipality of Kinn in Vestland county
Hovden, Nordland, a fishing village in the municipality of Bø in Nordland county

People
Anders Hovden, a Norwegian hymn writer, priest, author, and popular speaker
Knut Hovden, owner of Hovden (sardine) Cannery on Cannery Row in Monterey California (USA) 1916-1973 (now the world-famous Monterey Bay Aquarium)
Magne Hovden, a Norwegian writer

Other
Hovden Chapel, now called Fjellgardane Church, a church in Hovden in Bykle municipality in Aust-Agder, Norway
Hovden Cannery, a sardine cannery in Monterey, California (USA) that was in operation from 1916 to 1973 (now the world-famous Monterey Bay Aquarium)
Ørsta–Volda Airport, Hovden, an airport in the municipality of Ørsta, Møre og Romsdal, Norway